Etranger di Costarica Corporation (エトランジェ・ディ・コスタリカ) is a Japanese stationery company founded in 1985 in Hiroshima.

The company operates two stores under its own name and an additional ten under the names "Millefori Milano" (an Italian diffuser brand) and "grand musée".

The company's logo contains the French text: "mettre le courrier à la poste le courrier est arrivé"

References

External links
 Etranger di Costarica Official Site

Companies based in Hiroshima